The Oahu elepaio (Chasiempis ibidis) is a monarch flycatcher found on the Hawaiian Island of Oahu.

Taxonomy and systematics
The Oahu elepaio was formerly considered as a subspecies of the Hawaii elepaio until reclassified as a separate species in 2010.

Description
This species looks very similar to the Hawaiʻi ʻelepaio, but the white underside extends to the flanks and further up the breast, and the upperside - especially the head - is more rust-colored.

Threats
Avian malaria and fowlpox are widespread in the population and although it appears to have weathered the worst of it, it is threatened by a combination of these diseases and predation of nestlings, eggs and adult females by rats. In areas where rats are controlled, survival and nest success are higher.

Status
It is now restricted to an area of 47 square kilometers (18 sq mi) in the Koʻolau and Waiʻanae ranges, where a fragmented population of 1,200-1,400 birds occurs. It is listed as endangered. Recently completed surveys of populations in the Koʻolau range have unexpectedly revealed that the population has largely remained stable since surveys conducted in the 1990s. However, only about 20 individuals are left on the windward side of the Koʻolau range, with some valleys containing only a single elepaio.  Without intervention, this population faces extirpation in the near future due to small population phenomena.

References

 Conant, S. (1977): The breeding biology of the Oahu Elepaio. Wilson Bull. 89(2): 193–210. DjVu fulltext PDF fulltext
 VanderWerf, Eric A.; Rohrer, Joby L.; Smith, David G. & Burt, Matthew D. (2001): Current distribution and abundance of the Oahu Elepaio. Wilson Bull. 113(1): 10–16. DOI:10.1676/0043-5643(2001)113[0010:CDAAOT]2.0.CO;2 HTML abstract
 VanderWerf, Eric A.; Burt, Matthew D.; Rohrer, Joby L. & Mosher, Stephen M. (2006): Distribution and prevalence of mosquito-borne diseases in Oahu Elepaio [English with Spanish abstract]. Condor 108(4): 770–777. DOI:10.1650/0010-5422(2006)108[770:DAPOMD]2.0.CO;2 HTML abstract

External links
Species Factsheet - BirdLife International

Chasiempis
Endemic birds of Hawaii
Biota of Oahu
Endangered fauna of Hawaii
Birds described in 1887
ESA endangered species